L'altra faccia del padrino (internationally released as The Funny Face of the Godfather) is a 1973 Italian parody film directed by Franco Prosperi. It is a spoof of Francis Ford Coppola's 1972 film The Godfather.

Plot
The film partially follows the plotline of the 1972 film The Godfather but with numerous visual gags and sketch comedies along the way.  One major difference is that the protagonist is a young man who acts disguised as the godfather.

Cast 
Alighiero Noschese as Don Vito Monreale / Nick Buglione
Minnie Minoprio as  Bonnie
 Raymond Bussières as  Don Gennaro Magliulo
Lino Banfi as  Rocky Canosa
Fausto Tozzi as  Tony Malonzo
Stefano Satta Flores as  Jimmy Salvozzo
Elena Fiore as  Godfather's Wife
Haydée Politoff as  Angelica Magliulo
Lenny Montana as  Saro
Guido Leontini as Tom Iager
Mario Pilar  as Tartaglioni
Romano Puppo as Godfather's Henchman
Dada Gallotti

See also   
 List of Italian films of 1973

References

External links

1973 films
Italian parody films
Parody films based on The Godfather
Films produced by Dino De Laurentiis
Titanus films
1970s parody films
1973 comedy films
Films directed by Franco Prosperi
1970s American films
1970s Italian films
1970s Italian-language films